The Utah Field House of Natural History State Park Museum is a museum in Vernal, Utah, United States.

State park
The Utah Field House of Natural History State Park consists of a  structure on a  property. The museum displays prehistoric geological, anthropological, and natural history items found near the Uinta Mountains and within the Uinta Basin.

The park has a picnic area, and camping is available at nearby Red Fleet State Park Steinaker State Park and Dinosaur National Monument.

Museum features

The Utah Field House of Natural History contains a rotunda, three exhibit halls, a classroom, a theater, and an outdoor garden.

The Geology Hall displays algae, dinosaur, and mammal fossils spanning more than 600 million years of history. There are also artistic representations of these life forms along with paintings of the geology of the region.

The Anthropology Hall features the human history of the area. This includes Fremont Indian artifacts along with reproductions of local petroglyphs. There are also more modern Ute handicrafts and other cultural items.

The Natural History Hall contains examples of animal life native to the area, arranged along a mural of the local environment spanning from the higher altitudes of the Uinta Mountains down to the lower Uinta Basin.

Outside the museum is the Dinosaur Garden, which features 17 full-sized prehistoric animal replicas from the Pennsylvanian through the Pleistocene epochs on the Geological time scale. Highlights include a twenty-foot Tyrannosaurus, a Stegosaurus, and two Moschops. The majority of these items were created by sculptor Elbert Porter, and were purchased in 1977 for the Field House. The newest addition, obtained by the museum in 1993, is a model of a Coelophysis made by artist David Thomas.

History
In 1945, the Utah State Legislature approved building a state-owned natural history museum in Vernal. This was a result of efforts by the local Lions Club and others. This museum was to house and display fossil remains of ancient life, along with other natural history items. Funding was made available in 1946, and the museum opened in 1948. Since that time, it has hosted millions of visitors.

References

External links

Utah Field House of Natural History State Park Museum

Dinosaur museums in the United States
Museums in Uintah County, Utah
Natural history museums in Utah
Open-air museums in Utah
Protected areas established in 1959
Protected areas of Uintah County, Utah
State parks of Utah
1959 establishments in Utah
Paleontology in Utah